Working Girl is a 1988 American romantic comedy-drama film directed by Mike Nichols, written by Kevin Wade, and starring Harrison Ford, Sigourney Weaver, and Melanie Griffith. Its plot follows an ambitious secretary from Staten Island who takes over her new boss's role while the boss is laid up with a broken leg. The secretary, who has been going to business night school, pitches a profitable idea, only to have the boss attempt to take credit.

The film's opening sequence follows Manhattan-bound commuters on the Staten Island Ferry accompanied by Carly Simon's song "Let the River Run", for which she received the Academy Award for Best Original Song and the Golden Globe Award for Best Original Song. The film was met with critical acclaim, and was a major box office success, grossing a worldwide total of $103 million.

Working Girl was nominated for six Academy Awards in 1989, including Best Picture, Best Director for Nichols, and Best Actress for Griffith, while both Weaver and Joan Cusack were nominated for Best Supporting Actress. The film also won four Golden Globe Awards (from six nominations) in 1989, including Best Motion Picture – Musical or Comedy, Best Actress – Musical or Comedy for Griffith, and Best Supporting Actress for Weaver.

Plot
Tess McGill (Melanie Griffith), is a 30-year-old working-class woman from Staten Island who dreams of climbing the corporate ladder to an executive position. Despite holding a business degree earned through evening classes, her boss and male co-workers at the stockbroker firm in lower Manhattan where she works as a secretary treat her like a bimbo, even though they benefit from her intelligence and business instincts. After reaching her limit with her boss's humiliations, Tess dramatically quits.

Tess then lands a job as an administrative assistant to Katharine Parker (Sigourney Weaver), a young associate in Mergers and Acquisitions. At first, Katharine seems supportive of Tess, encouraging her to share ideas, but eventually tells Tess her proposed merger between Trask Industries and a radio station wouldn't work out.

When Katharine injures her leg skiing, she asks Tess to house-sit. While there, Tess discovers meeting notes that reveal Katharine plans to pass off the merger idea as her own. With her boss away, Tess decides to use Katharine's connections and clothes to move ahead with her merger plans. With the help of her friend Cyn (Joan Cusack), Tess cuts her hair and borrows Katherine's stylish clothing to look more professional. Tess schedules a meeting with Jack Trainer (Harrison Ford), a mergers and acquisitions associate from another company.

Although Tess lacks confidence during the meeting with Trainer and his associates and leaves thinking it was a failure, Jack soon arrives at her office and wants to move forward with her idea. Together, they prepare the financials for the merger proposal, and they give in to their attraction, ending up in bed. However, Tess is tempted to confess the truth about the idea's origins, but she demurs after discovering Jack is also involved with Katharine, who he planned to break up with before her injury.

Katharine returns home on the day of the merger meeting, and while Tess is helping her get settled, Jack arrives to end things with her. Tess accidentally leaves her appointment book in Katharine's apartment before leaving for the same meeting, leading to Katharine discovering Tess's deception.

Katharine confronts Tess during the meeting, outing her as her secretary and accusing her of stealing the idea. Tess feels she can't defend herself and leaves, apologizing profusely. Days later, Tess is offered an entry-level job with Trask Industries after Trask confronts Katharine, who is unable to explain where she got the merger idea, and promises to have her fired for her actions.

On her first day at Trask, Tess meets Alice, who she assumes will be working for her but is actually her secretary. Tess insists they work together as colleagues, showing she will be very different from Katharine. Finally, Tess calls Cyn from her own office to tell her she has made it.

Cast

Production

Development
Screenwriter Kevin Wade was inspired to write the screenplay after visiting New York City in 1984 and witnessing throngs of career women walking through the streets in tennis shoes while carrying their high-heels.

Casting
Melanie Griffith read the screenplay for Working Girl over a year before the production began, and expressed interest in playing the role of Tess McGill. Approximately a year later, Mike Nichols agreed to direct the film after reading the screenplay while shooting his film Biloxi Blues in Alaska. Following Nichols' attachment, Griffith had a formal audition for the role. Nichols was so determined for Griffith to have the part that he threatened to drop out of the production if the studio, 20th Century Fox, would not hire her.

Following the casting of Sigourney Weaver and Harrison Ford—both major stars at that point—the studio agreed to cast Griffith, as they felt Weaver and Ford's involvement gave them a higher chance of box-office success.

Filming
Principal photography of Working Girl began on February 16, 1988, in New York City. Many scenes were shot in the New Brighton section of Staten Island in New York City. One half-day of shooting to complete the skiing accident scene took place in New Jersey. Four different buildings portrayed the offices of Petty Marsh—1 State Street Plaza; the Midday Club, which served as the company's club room; the lobby of 7 World Trade Center (one of the buildings destroyed in the September 11 attacks); and the reading floor of the L. F. Rothschild Building. One Chase Manhattan Plaza was featured at the end of the film as the Trask Industries building. Filming completed on April 27, 1988, with the final sequence being shot on the Staten Island Ferry.

Throughout the shoot, Griffith was in the midst of struggling with a years-long alcohol and cocaine addiction, which at times interfered with the shoot. "There were a lot of things that happened on Working Girl that I did that were not right,” Griffith recalled in 2019. "It was the late ‘80s. There was a lot going on party-wise in New York. There was a lot of cocaine. There was a lot of temptation." After Nichols realized that Griffith had arrived on set high on cocaine, the shoot was temporarily shut down for 24 hours. Griffith elaborated on the experience:

Three weeks after filming was completed, Griffith entered a rehabilitation facility to receive treatment for her addiction. Ironically, according to the biography Mike Nichols: A Life, written by Mark Harris, Nichols had been battling a cocaine addiction of his own around the same time.

Music

The film's main theme "Let the River Run" was written, composed, and performed by American singer-songwriter Carly Simon, and won her an Academy Award, a Golden Globe Award, and a Grammy Award for Best Original Song, making Simon the first artist to win this trio of awards for a song composed and written, as well as performed, entirely by a single artist. As a single, "Let the River Run" reached No. 49 on the U.S. Billboard Hot 100 and No. 11 on the Billboard Adult Contemporary chart in early 1989.

The film's additional soundtrack was scored by Simon and Rob Mounsey. The soundtrack album was released by Arista Records on August 29, 1989, and peaked at No. 45 on the Billboard 200.

Release

Box office
The film was released in the United States on December 21, 1988, in 1,051 theaters and grossed $4.7 million on its opening weekend. It went on to make $63.8 million in North America and $39.2 million in the rest of the world for a worldwide total of $103 million.

Critical response
The film received generally positive reviews from critics. It currently has an 83% "Fresh" rating on Rotten Tomatoes based on 47 reviews, and an average score of 6.90/10. The site's consensus is; "A buoyant corporate Cinderella story, Working Girl has the right cast, right story, and right director to make it all come together." The film also has a weighted average score of 73 out of 100 at Metacritic based on reviews from 17 critics, indicating "generally favorable reviews". Audiences polled by CinemaScore gave the film an average grade of "A-" on an A+ to F scale.

Chicago Sun-Times film critic Roger Ebert gave the film four out of four stars and wrote, "The plot of Working Girl is put together like clockwork. It carries you along while you're watching it, but reconstruct it later and you'll see the craftsmanship". In her review for the Washington Post, Rita Kempley described Melanie Griffith as "luminous as Marilyn Monroe, as adorable as one of Disney's singing mice. She clearly has the stuff of a megastar, and the movie glows from her". Janet Maslin, in her review for The New York Times, wrote, "Mike Nichols, who directed Working Girl, also displays an uncharacteristically blunt touch, and in its later stages the story remains lively but seldom has the perceptiveness or acuity of Mr. Nichols's best work". In his review for Time, Richard Corliss wrote, "Kevin Wade shows this in his smart screenplay, which is full of the atmospheric pressures that allow stars to collide. Director Mike Nichols knows this in his bones. He encourages Weaver to play (brilliantly) an airy shrew. He gives Ford a boyish buoyancy and Griffith the chance to be a grownup mesmerizer".

Accolades

Honors
The film is recognized by American Film Institute in these lists:
2002: AFI's 100 Years...100 Passions – No. 91
2003: AFI's 100 Years...100 Heroes & Villains:
Tess McGill – Nominated Hero
Katherine Parker – Nominated Villain
2004: AFI's 100 Years...100 Songs:
"Let the River Run" – No. 91
2005: AFI's 100 Years...100 Movie Quotes:
Tess McGill: "I have a head for business and a bod for sin." – Nominated
2006: AFI's 100 Years...100 Cheers – No. 87
2008: AFI's 10 Top 10:
Nominated Romantic Comedy Film

Home media
Working Girl was released on VHS and Laserdisc in 1989 by CBS/Fox Video; "Family Portrait", one of the shorts from The Tracey Ullman Show featuring The Simpsons, was included before the movie on the VHS release. The film was released on DVD on April 17, 2001, by 20th Century Fox Home Entertainment. Special features included two theatrical trailers and three TV spots. The film was released on Blu-ray on January 6, 2015. The special features from the DVD release were carried over for the Blu-ray release.

In other media

Television

Working Girl was also made into a short-lived NBC television series in 1990, starring Sandra Bullock as Tess McGill. It lasted 12 episodes.

Theatre
A Broadway musical version is in the works as of 2017, with a score to be written by Cyndi Lauper from Fox Stage Productions and Aged in Wood Productions. For Aged in Wood, the producers were Robyn Goodman and Josh Fiedler.  Instead of a production company on Working Girl, the musical adaptation was switched to a license production by Aged in Wood Productions since Disney took over ownership of Fox Stage in 2019.

Reboot
A reboot of Working Girl has reported to be in development at Hulu, with Ilana Peña adapting the script. Selena Gomez is in talks to produce.

References

Sources

External links

1988 comedy-drama films
1980s business films
1980s romantic comedy-drama films
20th Century Fox films
American business films
American romantic comedy-drama films
American screwball comedy films
Best Musical or Comedy Picture Golden Globe winners
Films about businesspeople
Films about social class
Films adapted into television shows
Films featuring a Best Musical or Comedy Actress Golden Globe winning performance
Films featuring a Best Supporting Actress Golden Globe-winning performance
Films produced by Douglas Wick
Films directed by Mike Nichols
Films set in offices
Films set in New York City
Films shot in New Jersey
Films shot in New York City
Films that won the Best Original Song Academy Award
Films with screenplays by Kevin Wade
Workplace comedy films
1980s English-language films
1980s American films